Karak (also Kerak, Karak Nuh or Karak Noah) is a village in the municipality of Zahle in the Zahle District of the Beqaa Governorate in eastern Lebanon. It is located on the Baalbek road close to Zahle. Karak contains a sarcophagus claimed by the locals to be the tomb of Noah. The inhabitants of Karak are Melkites, Maronites and Shia Muslims.

History
The town was an important religious site during the Middle Ages, drawing devotion from the local rural village communities. The town was known as al-Karak during the time of the Ayyubid dynasty and changed to Karak Nuh under the Mamluks. 

During high medieval times, the town produced Shia muhaddith Ahmad bin Tariq bin Sinan (b. 1132). In the mid-13th century, the settlement to the north of Karak Nuh, Bḥaouchiyya, was inhabited by Tanukhid emirs from Mount Lebanon who practiced the Shia faith.
It became known as a center of learning for Shia Islam and the administrative centre of the southern Beqaa. Under the Mamluks Karak Nuh served as the administrative center of southern Beqaa. The Mamluk viceroy of Syria, Tankiz, established the first recorded waqf endowment for the shrine dedicated to Noah in Karak in 1331. Damascene historian Shams al-Din ibn Tūlūn (1475-1546), who visited the town described it resting on the slopes of Mount Lebanon, and its people famous for their Shia faith. 
A Safavid sheikh, Ali al-Karaki, and various dignitaries were born in the town. Under the Ottoman Empire, in around 1528, the Bedouin Banu Hanash emirs who controlled the southern Beqaa Valley in accord with the Harfush dynasty and other notable locals increased the waqf endowment and confirmed the Shia Muslim Alwan family as its hereditary custodians. In 1533–1548, the town was the second largest in the Beqaa valley after Baalbek, comprising 590 households, all Muslims. A major earthquake damaged the town's distinguishing minaret in 1705, which required repair.

In 1838, Eli Smith noted el-Kerak'''s population being Metawileh and Catholics.

Tomb of Noah
According to tradition mentioned by al-Mukaddasi and Al-Dimashqi, the tomb of Noah existed in the tenth century and can still be seen. There is a chapel next to the cenotaph building where several inscriptions (decrees) dating to the fourteenth century were found. There is also a courtyard outside the building with a prayer niche. The size of the monument possibly derives from tales of ancient giants, but is more realistically suggested to be a section of an ancient aqueduct that has been converted to serve as a shrine.Burton, p. 40 ff

Archaeology
A Roman inscription in Latin dating to the year 84 CE was found in the basement of a house to the south west of the tomb that called for the long life of the "man with many names".

Locale
Near to the town is the Ayn al-Garr spring and Massyas lake and marshes that are considered to be the source of the Litani river.
Notable people
Ahmad bin Tariq bin Sinan al-Karaki (1132–1195), Shia muḥaddith and grandson of Karak's former qadi''
Muhaqqiq al-Karaki (1465–1534), Shia scholar and Shaykh al-Islām of the Safavid Empire during the early reign of Tahmasp I
Muhammad al-Harfushi (d. 1649), cloth-maker, Arabic grammarian and poet from Karak Nuh who was persecuted for his Shia faith in Damascus and then moved to Iran where he received an official state post
Husayn al-Mujtahid al-Karaki, Shia scholar and maternal descendant of Muhaqqiq al-Karaki, served as Shaykh al-Islām of Qazvin and Ardabil

See also

 Tomb of Noah
 Al-Nabi Shayth
 List of burial places of Abrahamic figures

References

Bibliography

External links
 Photo of the inside of the Tomb of Noah on Flickr
 Tomb of Noah (with photos) on the blog of John Sanidopoulos
 Photo of Karak Nuh, minaret and the outside of the Tomb of Noah on Photobucket
  

Populated places in Zahlé District
Archaeological sites in Lebanon
Maronite Christian communities in Lebanon
Melkite Christian communities in Lebanon
Shia Muslim communities in Lebanon
Tourist attractions in Lebanon
Roman sites in Lebanon
Tomb of Noah